Made in NYC is a nonprofit initiative of the Pratt Center for Community Development that supports manufacturers and makers operating within the five boroughs of New York City. Funded with notable grants from the New York City Council as well as the Garment District Alliance, Made in NYC offers free membership to manufacturing companies with operations based in either the Bronx, Brooklyn, Manhattan, Queens, or Staten Island.

History 
Made in NYC was first founded in 2003 to rebuild urban manufacturing after the September 11 attacks, which impacted many communities and businesses within the city. Originally an initiative of the New York Industrial Retention Network (NYIRN), a nonprofit founded in 1976 with the mission "to promote a diverse economy that provides economic opportunities for all New Yorkers by strengthening New York City's manufacturing sector, based on principles of economic and environmental justice and sustainability,"  in 2010, the NYIRN joined the Pratt Center for Community Development, where it was then consolidated into one program called Made in NYC. Since then, Made in NYC has expanded its operations to offer free educational programming and creative services in marketing and branding to its members through their partnership with Pratt Institute.

Programming 
According to their website, the Made in NYC Learning Lab has four main branches of free programs for their members: Creative Services, DIY Production, Marketing Strategy, and Fashion Strategies. Among the creative services offered to their members are free product photography and video production. The DIY Production branch of their educational programming includes courses on photography techniques and sustainable packaging practices, while the Marketing Strategy programming includes courses on digital marketing strategies, website design and UX, merchandising strategy, and brand development. For the educational programming on Fashion Strategies, Made in NYC partnered with the Garment District Alliance Business Development Collaborative to offer courses specifically tailored to businesses operating within the Garment District of Manhattan.

Funding

The New York City Council 
According to the New York City Council Discretionary Funding database, Pratt Institute has received funding annually since 2015 to support the Made in NYC initiative.  

As listed in the 2016 fiscal year filing 5448, the NYC Department of Small Business Services awarded funding to support the Made in NYC initiative, which "will be used for a sourcing assistance program, marketing and advertising assistance to the manufacturing sector, to increase public awareness of NYC’s manufacturing sector through a targeted public relations strategy and to strengthen Made In NYC’s organizational capacity to achieve its mission." 

In the most recent fiscal year, the FY 2021 filing 06167 indicated that the NYC Department of Small Business Services awarded funding to the Made in NYC initiative "to provide branding and marketing assistance to manufacturing companies, enabling them to increase sales and create jobs."

The Garment District Alliance 
According to the Garment District Alliance’s 2019/2020 Annual Report, “the Alliance will be collaborating with Pratt Institute” to fund “programs for workforce development, business technical assistance, and other programs to strengthen the business community in the Garment District.”  This funding is allocated specifically toward the Fashion Strategies programming in the Made in NYC Learning Lab.

Notable members 
There are over 1400 members listed in the Made in NYC directory. Notable members of Made in NYC include the piano manufacturers Steinway & Sons, Acme Smoked Fish Corp., Gotham Greens, The Brooklyn Brewery, and The Bronx Brewery.

References

Non-profit organizations based in New York City
Manufacturing companies based in New York City
Nonprofit institutes based in the United States
2003 establishments in New York City
American companies established in 2003